Passion: White Flag is a collection of songs featuring sixstepsrecords artists Chris Tomlin, David Crowder Band, Charlie Hall, Matt Redman, Christy Nockels, and Kristian Stanfill. It was recorded live at Passion Conferences 2012 in Atlanta, Georgia, with more than 42,000 university-aged students in attendance. The album and its new song offerings reflect the desire of a generation to lay down their lives to live for the renown of Christ. The lead single, "White Flag", was released to radio airplay on February 24, 2012.

Commercial performance
The album debuted at No. 96 on the Canadian Albums Chart. In the US, the album debuted at No. 5 on the Billboard 200, selling 48,000 copies. The album also debuted at No. 1 on the Top Christian Albums chart.

Track listing

References

2012 live albums
Passion Conferences albums